Van Wijngaarden is a Dutch toponymic surname meaning "from Wijngaarden", a town in South Holland. Alternatively, it can refer to an origin in Sint Jacobiparochie in Friesland, which originally also was called "Wijngaarden". People with this name include:

Adriaan van Wijngaarden (1916–1987), Dutch mathematician and computer scientist
 He devised a.o. the Van Wijngaarden grammar and the Van Wijngaarden transformation
 (born 1964), Dutch archeologist
Jeroen van Wijngaarden (born 1978), Dutch VVD politician
 (1898–1950), Dutch motorcycle racer
Theo van Wijngaarden (1874–1952), Dutch art forger

References

Dutch-language surnames
Toponymic surnames